Atef Saad (born 20 March 1988) is a Tunisian long distance runner. He finished 62nd in the marathon at the 2016 Summer Olympics. In October 2017, Saad won the third edition of the "Run In Carthage".

References

External links

 

1988 births
Living people
Tunisian male long-distance runners
Tunisian male marathon runners
Place of birth missing (living people)
Athletes (track and field) at the 2016 Summer Olympics
Olympic athletes of Tunisia
Athletes (track and field) at the 2022 Mediterranean Games
Mediterranean Games competitors for Tunisia
21st-century Tunisian people